Handroanthus lapacho, is a Bignoniaceae tree native to Argentina (Jujuy, Salta) and Bolivia (Chuquisaca, Santa Cruz, Tarija).

References

lapacho
Trees of Argentina
Trees of Bolivia
Garden plants of South America
Ornamental trees